Peter Ashton may refer to:

 Peter Shaw Ashton (born 1934), British botanist
Peter Ashton (translator) (fl. 1546)
Peter Ashton novels, by Clive Egleton